David Laing may refer to:

Dave Laing (1947–2019), music journalist
David Laing (architect) (1774–1856), architect of the New Custom House, London
David Laing (antiquary) (1793–1878), Scottish antiquary
Davie Laing (1925–2017), Scottish footballer

See also 
David Lang (disambiguation)